Cloxotestosterone, also known as 17β-chloral hemiacetal testosterone, is a synthetic anabolic–androgenic steroid (AAS) and an androgen ether – specifically, the 17β-trichloro hemiacetal ether of testosterone – which was never marketed. The O-acetate ester of cloxotestosterone, cloxotestosterone acetate (brand name Caprosem), in contrast to cloxotestosterone, has been marketed.

See also
 List of androgen esters

References

Abandoned drugs
Androgen ethers
Androgens and anabolic steroids
Androstanes
Organochlorides
Prodrugs